Music Out of the Moon: Music Unusual Featuring the Theremin - Themes by Harry Revel (Capitol CC-47) is an album consisting of six songs on three 10-inch, 78 rpm records by bandleader Les Baxter and composer Harry Revel with theremin player Dr. Samuel J. Hoffman released on Capitol in April 1947. Music Out of the Moon is considered the best-selling theremin record of all time.

Music

The music was a mixture of late 1940s lounge jazz and film music underpinned by Hoffman’s otherworldly theremin playing. According to the liner notes: "Harry Revel created the basic "idea" and themes while Leslie Baxter, conductor and arranger, has given them appropriately unique tone color, using mass harmonies of human voices as well as unusual instrumental effects with woodwinds, strings and bass; some without rhythm, others with a dominant, demanding beat."

Cover

Music Out of the Moon was noteworthy for being one of the first albums to feature a full color cover – a risqué photograph by Paul Garrison of partially clothed actress Virginia Clark of the Earl Carroll Theatre, Hollywood, sprawled across a bed – which made it stand out in an era of monochrome album packaging.

Reissues

Music Out of the Moon was reissued by Capitol in 1950 on one 10-inch, 33⅓ rpm disc (Capitol H-2000).

In 1954, Music Out of the Moon was combined with Music for Peace of Mind -- a six-song 1950 collaboration between Billy May, Revel and Hoffman -- on one 12-inch, 33⅓ rpm disc (Capitol T390).

In 1999, Basta reissued Music Out of the Moon on a CD called Dr. Samuel J. Hoffman and the Theremin, which also included Perfume Set to Music (1948) and Music for Peace of Mind (1950).  In 2004, Rev-Ola issued the same three albums on a CD called Waves in the Ether: The Magical World of the Theremin.

Played in space by Neil Armstrong

The Hollywood producer Mickey Kapp compiled a cassette tape of tracks from the album for astronaut Neil Armstrong, who brought the tape on the Apollo 11 Moon mission in 1969. (NASA audio recording) The record appears in First Man, the 2018 biopic of Armstrong directed by Damien Chazelle.

Track listing (CC-47)

External links

Track recordings online:
 Lunar Rhapsody
 Moon Moods
 Lunette
 Celestial Nocturne
 Mist O' The Moon
 Radar Blues

References

1947 albums
Les Baxter albums
Samuel Hoffman albums
Works about the Moon